Bonakas is a village in Deatnu-Tana Municipality in Troms og Finnmark county, Norway.  The village lies on the western bank of the Tana River, just north of the village of Rustefjelbma.

Historically, Bonakas has been inhabited by the Sami people and Kven people, more recently newcomers from the more southern parts of Norway and Finland have moved in. However, Tana municipality, unlike Porsanger, has not declared Kven an official language.

References

Villages in Finnmark
Tana, Norway
Populated places of Arctic Norway